Zorita de la Frontera is a municipality in the province of Salamanca, western Spain, part of the autonomous community of Castile and León. It is located 54 kilometers from the city of Salamanca.

References

Municipalities in the Province of Salamanca